DejaGnu is a software framework for testing other programs. It has a main script called runtest that goes through a directory looking at configuration files and then runs some tests with given criteria.  The purpose of the DejaGnu package is to provide a single front end for all tests. It is a part of the GNU Project and is licensed under the GPL. It is based on Expect, which is in turn based on Tcl. The current maintainers are Rob Savoye and Ben Elliston.

Testing
DejaGnu has a very strong history in testing due to its Tcl base. Tcl is used extensively by companies such as Oracle and Sybase to test their products. DejaGnu allows this work to be much more structured.

The tests can be grouped according to the tool they are testing. The test is run by merely calling  in the root project directory.
  runtest --tool program_to_test

Embedded design
One field for which DejaGnu is particularly well suited is that of embedded system design.  It allows for testing to be done remotely on development boards; separate initialization files can be created for each operating system and board. This mainly focuses on embedded targets and remote hosts. DejaGnu is thus popular with many GNU projects,  at universities, and for private companies.

Files
Essential Files

 Each directory in testsuite should contain tests for a specific tool. In this example, the tool being tested is the Apache webserver.
   This will be the file containing tests, which in this fictional case might change configuration options, and then connect to the network and check to make sure the changes have taken effect.

 This file will be run as a tool init file for the tool called toolname.

Other Files
Options can be placed in this file rather than retyped on each invocation; these options can include any variable passed as a command line argument.
 set tool Apache         #run tests on Apache
 set srcdir ./testsuite  #look here for test files
 set outdir ./logs       #save the logs in a separate directory
 set all 1               #show results from all tests (rather than just ones with errors)
   This is a personal configuration file, which should be located in the user's home directory
   This is the first configuration file loaded. It can be named anything but must be pointed to by the $DEJAGNU environment variable (set when your terminal loads).

References

External links
DejaGnu Homepage
DejaGnu Tutorial (dead link : obsolete since https://www.gnu.org/software/dejagnu/manual/index.html exists ?)
DejaGnu Bug Archives

Software testing tools
Scripting languages
Free software programmed in Tcl
GNU Project software